Sacabambaspis is an extinct genus of jawless fish that lived in the Ordovician period. Sacabambaspis lived in shallow waters on the continental margins of Gondwana. It is the best known arandaspid with many specimens. It is related to Arandaspis.

Description 

The body shape of Sacabambaspis vaguely resembled that of a tadpole with an oversized head, flat body, wriggling tail, and lack of fins. It had characteristic, frontally positioned eyes, like car head lamps.

Armor 
Sacabambaspis had a head shield made from a large upper (dorsal) plate that rose to a slight ridge in the midline, and a deep curved lower (ventral) plate, this headshield is ornamented with characteristic oak-leaf shaped or tear-drop shaped tubercles. Also it had narrow branchial plates which link these two along the sides, and cover the gill area. The eyes were far forward and between them are possibly two small nostrils and they, which are surrounded by what is thought to be endoskeletal bone, and putative nostrils, are found at the extreme anterior of the head, one of the diagnostic features of the arandaspids. The rest of the body was covered by long, strap-like scales behind the head shield.

Tail 
The tail consists of relatively large dorsal and ventral webs and an elongated notochordal lobe, the posterior end of which is bordered by a small fin web. This tail structure clearly differs from that of heterostracans, which are currently grouped with arandaspids and astraspids in the clade Pteraspidomorphi (Gagnier 1993, 1995; Donoghue & Smith 2001; Sansom et al. 2005), in which the caudal fin looks diphycercal (i.e. symmetrical) and strengthened by a few large radials (Janvier 1996).

Discovery and species 

Sacabambaspis is named after the village of Sacabamba, Cochabamba Department, Bolivia, where the first fossils of the genus were found. S. janvieri (Gagnier, Blieck & Rodrico, 1986), the type species of the genus, is known from the Anzaldo Formation of Bolivia. There are 30 known specimens of this Bolivian species, all crammed into a very confined area, believed to be the result of a fish kill, probably due a sudden inflow of freshwater from a large storm. They were found associated with a large number of lingulid brachiopods, also killed at the same time.

Indeterminate specimens (described as "Sacabambaspis sp.") have been found in many countries corresponding to the margin of Gondwana. Young, 1997 described fossils of the genus from the Stokes Siltstone and Carmichael Sandstone of Central Australia. Isolated scales found in the Horn Creek Siltstone from Central Australia have a very similar ornamentation to the Bolivian scales. Specimens have also been reported from Argentina. Sansom et al., 2009 described specimens from the Amdeh Formation of Oman on the Arabian Peninsula. The Oman discoveries showed that the fish were present all around the periphery of the ancient continent of Gondwana and not just in the southern regions as had previously been shown by the findings from South America and Australia.

Paleobiology

Feeding 
Although it had no jaws, the mouth of Sacabambaspis janvieri was lined with nearly 60 rows of small bony oral plates which were probably movable in order to provide more efficient suction-action through expansion and contraction of the oral cavity and pharynx.

Sensory system 
The fossils of Sacabambaspis show clear evidence of a sensory structure (lateral line system). This is a line of pores within each of which are open nerve endings that can detect slight movements in the water, produced for example by predators. The arrangement of these organs in regular lines allows the fish to detect the direction and distance from which a disturbance in the water is coming.

See also 
 Arandaspida

References

External links 
 Pteraspidomorphi at Palaeos

Pteraspidomorphi genera
Ordovician jawless fish
Late Ordovician animals
Fossils of Oman
Prehistoric fish of Australia
Ordovician animals of Oceania
Fossils of Australia
Ordovician animals of South America
Ordovician Argentina
Fossils of Argentina
Ordovician Bolivia
Fossils of Bolivia
Fossil taxa described in 1986
Ordovician animals of Asia